Oak Hill may refer to:

Places

United States 
Oak Hill, Alabama
Oak Hill, Florida
Oak Hill, Kansas
Oak Hill, Kentucky
Oak Hill, Maine
Oak Hill, Massachusetts
Oak Hill, Missouri
Oak Hill, New Jersey
Oak Hill, New York, a hamlet in Greene County
Oak Hill (Herkimer County, New York), an elevation in Herkimer County
Oak Hill, Ohio
Oak Hill, Tennessee
Oak Hill, Texas (disambiguation), several places
Oak Hill, Albemarle County, Virginia
Oak Hill, Fairfax County, Virginia
Oak Hill, Page County, Virginia
Oak Hill, Pittsylvania County, Virginia
Oak Hill, West Virginia
Oak Hill, Wisconsin

Other 
Oak Hill, Nova Scotia, Canada
Oak Hill, Staffordshire, England
Oak Hill, Suffolk, a location in England

Buildings
 Oak Hill (James Monroe House), a mansion and plantation in Aldie, Virginia
 Oak Hill & The Martha Berry Museum, the home of Berry College founder Martha Berry in Rome, Georgia
 Oak Hill (Calvert City, Kentucky)
 Oak Hill (Jessup, Maryland)
 Oak Hill (Linlithgo, New York)
 Oak Hill (Chillicothe, Ohio)
 Oak Hill (Annandale, Virginia), a Georgian style home built in 1790
 Oak Hill (Colonial Heights, Virginia), a building from 1825
 Oak Hill (Cumberland, Virginia), a Federal style building from 1810
 Oak Hill (Delaplane, Virginia), a private residence consisting of two separate houses connected by a passageway
 Oak Hill (Oak Ridge, Virginia), a historic plantation

Other uses
 USS Oak Hill (LSD-7), an Ashland-class dock landing ship launched in 1943 and struck in 1969
 USS Oak Hill (LSD-51), a Harpers Ferry-class dock landing ship launched in 1994

See also
Oak Hill Academy (disambiguation)
Oak Hill Cemetery (disambiguation)
Oak Hill Historic District (disambiguation)
Oak Hill Township (disambiguation)
Oak Hill Country Club, Rochester, New York
Oak Hill-Piney, Oklahoma
Oak Hill Theological College, Southgate, London
Oakhill (disambiguation)
Oak Hills (disambiguation)